The 88th United States Congress was a meeting of the legislative branch of the United States federal government, composed of the United States Senate and the United States House of Representatives. It met in Washington, D.C., from January 3, 1963, to January 3, 1965, during the final months of the presidency of John F. Kennedy, and the first years of the presidency of his successor, Lyndon B. Johnson. The apportionment of seats in this House of Representatives was based on the 1960 United States census, and the number of members was again 435 (it had temporarily been 437 in order to seat one member each from recently admitted states of Alaska and Hawaii).

Both chambers maintained a Democratic majority - including a filibuster-proof supermajority in the Senate - and with President Kennedy, the Democrats maintained an overall federal government trifecta.

Major events

 November 22, 1963: Vice President Lyndon B. Johnson became President of the United States on the death of President John F. Kennedy.
 March 30 – June 10, 1964: The longest filibuster in the history of the Senate was waged against the Civil Rights Act of 1964, with 57 days of debate over a 73-day period. It ended when the Senate voted 71–29 to invoke cloture, with the filibuster carried out by southern members of the Democratic Party, the first successful cloture motion on a civil rights bill.
August 2–4, 1964: Gulf of Tonkin Incident
November 3, 1964: President Lyndon Johnson is elected to a full term in the 1964 United States Presidential election, defeating Republican nominee Barry Goldwater.

Major legislation

 June 10, 1963: Equal Pay Act, 
 October 17, 1963: Department of Defense Appropriations Act, 
 October 31, 1963: Community Mental Health Centers Act, title II, including Mental Retardation Facilities Construction Act
 December 17, 1963: Clean Air Act, 
 July 2, 1964: Civil Rights Act of 1964, 
 July 9, 1964: Urban Mass Transportation Act of 1964 (Federal Transit Act), 
 August 7, 1964: Tonkin Gulf Resolution, 
 August 20, 1964: Economic Opportunity Act of 1964, 
 August 31, 1964: Food Stamp Act of 1964, 
 September 3, 1964: Wilderness Act, 
 September 4, 1964: Nurse Training Act, 
 1964: Library Services and Construction Act

Constitutional amendments
 January 23, 1964: Twenty-fourth Amendment to the United States Constitution, prohibiting both Congress and the states from conditioning the right to vote in federal elections on payment of a poll tax or other types of tax, was ratified by the requisite number of states (then 38) to become part of the Constitution

Party summary

Senate

House of Representatives

Leadership

Senate 
 President: Lyndon B. Johnson (D), until November 22, 1963; thereafter vacant
 President pro tempore: Carl Hayden (D)
 Permanent Acting President pro tempore: Lee Metcalf (D), from June 15, 1963

Majority (Democratic) leadership 
Majority Leader: Mike Mansfield 
 Majority Whip: Hubert Humphrey 
 Caucus Secretary: George Smathers

Minority (Republican) leadership 
 Minority Leader: Everett Dirksen 
 Minority Whip: Thomas Kuchel 
 Republican Conference Chairman: Leverett Saltonstall 
 Republican Conference Secretary: Milton Young 
 National Senatorial Committee Chair: Thruston Ballard Morton 
 Policy Committee Chairman: Bourke B. Hickenlooper

House of Representatives 
 Speaker: John W. McCormack (D)

Majority (Democratic) leadership 
 Majority Leader: Carl Albert 
 Majority Whip: Hale Boggs 
 Democratic Caucus Chairman: Francis E. Walter, until May 31, 1963
 Albert Thomas, from January 21, 1964
 Democratic Campaign Committee Chairman: Michael J. Kirwan

Minority (Republican) leadership 
 Minority Leader: Charles A. Halleck 
 Minority Whip: Leslie C. Arends 
 Republican Conference Chairman: Gerald Ford 
 Policy Committee Chairman: John W. Byrnes
 Republican Campaign Committee Chairman: Bob Wilson

Caucuses
 House Democratic Caucus
 Senate Democratic Caucus

Members

Senate
Senators are popularly elected statewide every two years, with one-third beginning new six-year terms with each Congress. Senators are ordered first by state, and then by class. Preceding the names in the list below are Senate class numbers, which indicate the cycle of their election, In this Congress, Class 1 meant their term ended with this Congress, requiring reelection in 1964; Class 2 meant their term began in the last Congress, requiring reelection in 1966; and Class 3 meant their term began in this Congress, requiring reelection in 1968.

Alabama
 2. John Sparkman (D)
 3. J. Lister Hill (D)

Alaska
 2. Bob Bartlett (D)
 3. Ernest Gruening (D)

Arizona
 1. Barry Goldwater (R)
 3. Carl Hayden (D)

Arkansas
 2. John L. McClellan (D)
 3. J. William Fulbright (D)

California
 1. Clair Engle (D), until July 30, 1964
 Pierre Salinger (D), August 4, 1964 – December 31, 1964
 George Murphy (R), from January 1, 1965
 3. Thomas Kuchel (R)

Colorado
 2. Gordon Allott (R)
 3. Peter H. Dominick (R)

Connecticut
 1. Thomas J. Dodd (D)
 3. Abraham Ribicoff (D)

Delaware
 1. John J. Williams (R)
 2. J. Caleb Boggs (R)

Florida
 1. Spessard Holland (D)
 3. George Smathers (D)

Georgia
 2. Richard Russell Jr. (D)
 3. Herman Talmadge (D)

Hawaii
 1. Hiram Fong (R)
 2. Daniel Inouye (D)

Idaho
 2. Leonard B. Jordan (R)
 3. Frank Church (D)

Illinois
 2. Paul Douglas (D)
 3. Everett Dirksen (R)

Indiana
 1. Vance Hartke (D)
 3. Birch Bayh (D)

Iowa
 2. Jack Miller (R)
 3. Bourke B. Hickenlooper (R)

Kansas
 2. James B. Pearson (R)
 3. Frank Carlson (R)

Kentucky
 2. John Sherman Cooper (R)
 3. Thruston Ballard Morton (R)

Louisiana
 2. Allen J. Ellender (D)
 3. Russell B. Long (D)

Maine
 1. Edmund Muskie (D)
 2. Margaret Chase Smith (R)

Maryland
 1. James Glenn Beall (R)
 3. Daniel Brewster (D)

Massachusetts
 1. Ted Kennedy (D)
 2. Leverett Saltonstall (R)

Michigan
 1. Philip Hart (D)
 2. Patrick V. McNamara (D)

Minnesota
 1. Eugene McCarthy (DFL)
 2. Hubert Humphrey (DFL), until December 29, 1964
 Walter Mondale (DFL), from December 30, 1964

Mississippi
 1. John C. Stennis (D)
 2. James Eastland (D)

Missouri
 1. Stuart Symington (D)
 3. Edward V. Long (D)

Montana
 1. Mike Mansfield (D)
 2. Lee Metcalf (D)

Nebraska
 1. Roman Hruska (R)
 2. Carl Curtis (R)

Nevada
 1. Howard Cannon (D)
 3. Alan Bible (D)

New Hampshire
 2. Thomas J. McIntyre (D)
 3. Norris Cotton (R)

New Jersey
 1. Harrison A. Williams (D)
 2. Clifford P. Case (R)

New Mexico
 1. Edwin L. Mechem (R), until November 3, 1964
 Joseph Montoya (D), from November 4, 1964
 2. Clinton Anderson (D)

New York
 1. Kenneth Keating (R)
 3. Jacob Javits (R)

North Carolina
 2. B. Everett Jordan (D)
 3. Sam Ervin (D)

North Dakota
 1. Quentin Burdick (D-NPL)
 3. Milton Young (R)

Ohio
 1. Stephen M. Young (D)
 3. Frank Lausche (D)

Oklahoma
 2. J. Howard Edmondson (D), January 7, 1963 – November 3, 1964
 Fred R. Harris (D), from November 4, 1964
 3. Mike Monroney (D)

Oregon
 2. Maurine Neuberger (D)
 3. Wayne Morse (D)

Pennsylvania
 1. Hugh Scott (R)
 3. Joseph S. Clark Jr. (D)

Rhode Island
 1. John Pastore (D)
 2. Claiborne Pell (D)

South Carolina
 2. Strom Thurmond (D) until September 16, 1964, then (R)
 3. Olin D. Johnston (D)

South Dakota
 2. Karl E. Mundt (R)
 3. George McGovern (D)

Tennessee
 1. Albert Gore Sr. (D)
 2. Estes Kefauver (D), until August 10, 1963
 Herbert S. Walters (D), August 20, 1963 – November 3, 1964
 Ross Bass (D), from November 4, 1964

Texas
 1. Ralph Yarborough (D)
 2. John Tower (R)

Utah
 1. Frank Moss (D)
 3. Wallace F. Bennett (R)

Vermont
 1. Winston L. Prouty (R)
 3. George Aiken (R)

Virginia
 1. Harry F. Byrd (D)
 2. Absalom Willis Robertson (D)

Washington
 1. Henry M. Jackson (D)
 3. Warren Magnuson (D)

West Virginia
 1. Robert Byrd (D)
 2. Jennings Randolph (D)

Wisconsin
 1. William Proxmire (D)
 3. Gaylord Nelson (D), from January 8, 1963

Wyoming
 1. Gale W. McGee (D)
 2. Milward Simpson (R)

House of Representatives

Alabama
 . George Huddleston Jr. (D)
 . George M. Grant (D)
 . George W. Andrews (D)
 . Kenneth A. Roberts (D)
 . Albert Rains (D)
 . Armistead I. Selden Jr. (D)
 . Carl Elliott (D)
 . Robert E. Jones Jr. (D)

Alaska
 . Ralph Julian Rivers (D)

Arizona
 . John Jacob Rhodes (R)
 . Mo Udall (D)
 . George F. Senner Jr. (D)

Arkansas
 . Ezekiel C. Gathings (D)
 . Wilbur Mills (D)
 . James William Trimble (D)
 . Oren Harris (D)

California
 . Donald H. Clausen (R), from January 22, 1963
 . Harold T. Johnson (D)
 . John E. Moss (D)
 . Robert L. Leggett (D)
 . John F. Shelley (D), until January 7, 1964
 Phillip Burton (D), from February 18, 1964
 . William S. Mailliard (R)
 . Jeffery Cohelan (D)
 . George P. Miller (D)
 . Don Edwards (D)
 . Charles Gubser (R)
 . J. Arthur Younger (R)
 . Burt Talcott (R)
 . Charles M. Teague (R)
 . John F. Baldwin Jr. (R)
 . John J. McFall (D)
 . B. F. Sisk (D)
 . Cecil R. King (D)
 . Harlan Hagen (D)
 . Chester E. Holifield (D)
 . H. Allen Smith (R)
 . Augustus Hawkins (D)
 . James C. Corman (D)
 . Clyde Doyle (D), until March 14, 1963
 Del M. Clawson (R), from June 11, 1963
 . Glenard P. Lipscomb (R)
 . Ronald B. Cameron (D)
 . James Roosevelt (D)
 . Everett G. Burkhalter (D)
 . Alphonzo E. Bell Jr. (R)
 . George Brown Jr. (D)
 . Edward R. Roybal (D)
 . Charles H. Wilson (D)
 . Craig Hosmer (R)
 . Harry R. Sheppard (D)
 . Richard T. Hanna (D)
 . James B. Utt (R)
 . Bob Wilson (R)
 . Lionel Van Deerlin (D)
 . Patrick M. Martin (R)

Colorado
 . Byron G. Rogers (D)
 . Donald G. Brotzman (R)
 . John Chenoweth (R)
 . Wayne N. Aspinall (D)

Connecticut
 . Bernard F. Grabowski (D)
 . Emilio Q. Daddario (D)
 . William St. Onge (D)
 . Robert Giaimo (D)
 . Abner W. Sibal (R)
 . John S. Monagan (D)

Delaware
 . Harris McDowell (D)

Florida
 . Bob Sikes (D)
 . Charles E. Bennett (D)
 . Claude Pepper (D)
 . Dante Fascell (D)
 . Syd Herlong (D)
 . Paul Rogers (D)
 . James A. Haley (D)
 . Donald Ray Matthews (D)
 . Don Fuqua (D)
 . Sam Gibbons (D)
 . Edward Gurney (R)
 . William C. Cramer (R)

Georgia
 . George Elliott Hagan (D)
 . J. L. Pilcher (D)
 . Tic Forrester (D)
 . John Flynt (D)
 . Charles L. Weltner (D)
 . Carl Vinson (D)
 . John William Davis (D)
 . J. Russell Tuten (D)
 . Phillip M. Landrum (D)
 . Robert Grier Stephens Jr. (D)

Hawaii
 . Thomas Gill (D)
 . Spark Matsunaga (D)

Idaho
 . Compton I. White Jr. (D)
 . Ralph R. Harding (D)

Illinois
 . William L. Dawson (D)
 . Barratt O'Hara (D)
 . William T. Murphy (D)
 . Ed Derwinski (R)
 . John C. Kluczynski (D)
 . Thomas J. O'Brien (D), until April 14, 1964
 . Roland V. Libonati (D)
 . Dan Rostenkowski (D)
 . Edward Rowan Finnegan (D), until December 6, 1964
 . Harold R. Collier (R)
 . Roman Pucinski (D)
 . Robert McClory (R)
 . Donald Rumsfeld (R)
 . Elmer J. Hoffman (R)
 . Charlotte Thompson Reid (R)
 . John B. Anderson (R)
 . Leslie C. Arends (R)
 . Robert H. Michel (R)
 . Robert T. McLoskey (R)
 . Paul Findley (R)
 . Kenneth J. Gray (D)
 . William L. Springer (R)
 . George E. Shipley (D)
 . Melvin Price (D)

Indiana
 . Ray Madden (D)
 . Charles A. Halleck (R)
 . John Brademas (D)
 . E. Ross Adair (R)
 . J. Edward Roush (D)
 . Richard L. Roudebush (R)
 . William G. Bray (R)
 . Winfield K. Denton (D)
 . Earl Wilson (R)
 . Ralph Harvey (R)
 . Donald C. Bruce (R)

Iowa
 . Fred Schwengel (R)
 . James E. Bromwell (R)
 . H. R. Gross (R)
 . John Henry Kyl (R)
 . Neal Edward Smith (D)
 . Charles B. Hoeven (R)
 . Ben F. Jensen (R)

Kansas
 . Bob Dole (R)
 . William H. Avery (R)
 . Robert Ellsworth (R)
 . Garner E. Shriver (R)
 . Joe Skubitz (R)

Kentucky
 . Frank Stubblefield (D)
 . William Natcher (D)
 . Gene Snyder (R)
 . Frank Chelf (D)
 . Eugene Siler (R)
 . John C. Watts (D)
 . Carl D. Perkins (D)

Louisiana
 . F. Edward Hébert (D)
 . Hale Boggs (D)
 . Edwin E. Willis (D)
 . Joe Waggonner (D)
 . Otto Passman (D)
 . James H. Morrison (D)
 . T. Ashton Thompson (D)
 . Gillis William Long (D)

Maine
 . Stanley R. Tupper (R)
 . Clifford McIntire (R)

Maryland
 . Carlton R. Sickles (D)
 . Rogers Morton (R)
 . Clarence Long (D)
 . Edward Garmatz (D)
 . George Hyde Fallon (D)
 . Richard Lankford (D)
 . Charles Mathias (R)
 . Samuel Friedel (D)

Massachusetts
 . Silvio O. Conte (R)
 . Edward Boland (D)
 . Philip J. Philbin (D)
 . Harold Donohue (D)
 . F. Bradford Morse (R)
 . William H. Bates (R)
 . Torbert Macdonald (D)
 . Tip O'Neill (D)
 . John W. McCormack (D)
 . Joseph W. Martin Jr. (R)
 . James A. Burke (D)
 . Hastings Keith (R)

Michigan
 . Neil Staebler (D)
 . Lucien Nedzi (D)
 . George Meader (R)
 . August E. Johansen (R)
 . J. Edward Hutchinson (R)
 . Gerald Ford (R)
 . Charles E. Chamberlain (R)
 . James G. O'Hara (D)
 . R. James Harvey (R)
 . Robert P. Griffin (R)
 . Elford Albin Cederberg (R)
 . Victor A. Knox (R)
 . John B. Bennett (R), until August 9, 1964
 . Charles Diggs (D)
 . Harold M. Ryan (D)
 . John Dingell (D)
 . John Lesinski Jr. (D)
 . Martha Griffiths (D)
 . William Broomfield (R)

Minnesota
 . Al Quie (R)
 . Ancher Nelsen (R)
 . Clark MacGregor (R)
 . Joseph Karth (DFL)
 . Donald M. Fraser (DFL)
 . Alec G. Olson (DFL)
 . Odin Langen (R)
 . John Blatnik (DFL)

Mississippi
 . Thomas Abernethy (D)
 . Jamie Whitten (D)
 . John Bell Williams (D)
 . W. Arthur Winstead (D)
 . William M. Colmer (D)

Missouri
 . Frank M. Karsten (D)
 . Thomas B. Curtis (R)
 . Leonor Sullivan (D)
 . William J. Randall (D)
 . Richard Walker Bolling (D)
 . William Raleigh Hull Jr. (D)
 . Durward Gorham Hall (R)
 . Richard Howard Ichord Jr. (D)
 . Clarence Cannon (D), until May 12, 1964
 William L. Hungate (D), from November 3, 1964
 . Paul C. Jones (D)

Montana
 . Arnold Olsen (D)
 . James F. Battin (R)

Nebraska
 . Ralph F. Beermann (R)
 . Glenn Cunningham (R)
 . David Martin (R)

Nevada
 . Walter S. Baring Jr. (D)

New Hampshire
 . Louis C. Wyman (R)
 . James Colgate Cleveland (R)

New Jersey
 . William T. Cahill (R)
 . Milton W. Glenn (R)
 . James C. Auchincloss (R)
 . Frank Thompson (D)
 . Peter Frelinghuysen Jr. (R)
 . Florence P. Dwyer (R)
 . William B. Widnall (R)
 . Charles Samuel Joelson (D)
 . Frank C. Osmers Jr. (R)
 . Peter W. Rodino (D)
 . Joseph Minish (D)
 . George M. Wallhauser (R)
 . Cornelius Gallagher (D)
 . Dominick V. Daniels (D)
 . Edward J. Patten (D)

New Mexico
 . Thomas G. Morris (D)
 . Joseph Montoya (D), until November 3, 1964

New York
 . Otis G. Pike (D)
 . James R. Grover Jr. (R)
 . Steven Derounian (R)
 . John W. Wydler (R)
 . Frank J. Becker (R)
 . Seymour Halpern (R)
 . Joseph P. Addabbo (D)
 . Benjamin Stanley Rosenthal (D)
 . James J. Delaney (D)
 . Emanuel Celler (D)
 . Eugene James Keogh (D)
 . Edna F. Kelly (D)
 . Abraham J. Multer (D)
 . John J. Rooney (D)
 . Hugh Carey (D)
 . John M. Murphy (D)
 . John Lindsay (R)
 . Adam Clayton Powell Jr. (D)
 . Leonard Farbstein (D)
 . William Fitts Ryan (D)
 . James C. Healey (D)
 . Jacob H. Gilbert (D)
 . Charles A. Buckley (D)
 . Paul A. Fino (R)
 . Robert R. Barry (R)
 . Ogden R. Reid (R)
 . Katharine St. George (R)
 . J. Ernest Wharton (R)
 . Leo W. O'Brien (D)
 . Carleton J. King (R)
 . Clarence E. Kilburn (R)
 . Alexander Pirnie (R)
 . Howard W. Robison (R)
 . R. Walter Riehlman (R)
 . Samuel S. Stratton (D)
 . Frank Horton (R)
 . Harold C. Ostertag (R)
 . Charles Goodell (R)
 . John R. Pillion (R)
 . William E. Miller (R)
 . Thaddeus J. Dulski (D)

North Carolina
 . Herbert Covington Bonner (D)
 . Lawrence H. Fountain (D)
 . David N. Henderson (D)
 . Harold D. Cooley (D)
 . Ralph James Scott (D)
 . Horace R. Kornegay (D)
 . Alton Lennon (D)
 . Charles R. Jonas (R)
 . Jim Broyhill (R)
 . Basil Lee Whitener (D)
 . Roy A. Taylor (D)

North Dakota
 . Hjalmar Carl Nygaard (R), until July 18, 1963
 Mark Andrews (R), from October 22, 1963
 . Don L. Short (R)

Ohio
 . Robert Taft Jr. (R)
 . Carl West Rich (R)
 . Donald D. Clancy (R)
 . Paul F. Schenck (R)
 . William Moore McCulloch (R)
 . Del Latta (R)
 . Bill Harsha (R)
 . Clarence J. Brown (R)
 . Jackson Edward Betts (R)
 . Thomas L. Ashley (D)
 . Pete Abele (R)
 . Oliver P. Bolton (R)
 . Samuel L. Devine (R)
 . Charles Adams Mosher (R)
 . William Hanes Ayres (R)
 . Robert T. Secrest (D)
 . Frank T. Bow (R)
 . John M. Ashbrook (R)
 . Wayne Hays (D)
 . Michael J. Kirwan (D)
 . Michael A. Feighan (D)
 . Charles Vanik (D)
 . Frances P. Bolton (R)
 . William Edwin Minshall Jr. (R)

Oklahoma
 . Page Belcher (R)
 . Ed Edmondson (D)
 . Carl Albert (D)
 . Tom Steed (D)
 . John Jarman (D)
 . Victor Wickersham (D)

Oregon
 . A. Walter Norblad (R), until September 20, 1964
 Wendell Wyatt (R), from November 3, 1964
 . Al Ullman (D)
 . Edith Green (D)
 . Robert B. Duncan (D)

Pennsylvania
 . William A. Barrett (D)
 . Robert N. C. Nix Sr. (D)
 . James A. Byrne (D)
 . Herman Toll (D)
 . William J. Green Jr. (D), until December 21, 1963
 William J. Green III (D), from April 28, 1964
 . George M. Rhodes (D)
 . William H. Milliken Jr. (R)
 . Willard S. Curtin (R)
 . Paul B. Dague (R)
 . Joseph M. McDade (R)
 . Dan Flood (D)
 . J. Irving Whalley (R)
 . Richard Schweiker (R)
 . William S. Moorhead (D)
 . Francis E. Walter (D), until May 31, 1963
 Fred B. Rooney (D), from July 30, 1963
 . John C. Kunkel (R)
 . Herman T. Schneebeli (R)
 . Robert J. Corbett (R)
 . George Atlee Goodling (R)
 . Elmer J. Holland (D)
 . John Herman Dent (D)
 . John P. Saylor (R)
 . Leon H. Gavin (R), until September 15, 1963
 Albert W. Johnson (R), from November 5, 1963
 . James D. Weaver (R)
 . Frank M. Clark (D)
 . Thomas E. Morgan (D)
 . James G. Fulton (R)

Rhode Island
 . Fernand St. Germain (D)
 . John E. Fogarty (D)

South Carolina
 . L. Mendel Rivers (D)
 . Albert Watson (D)
 . William Jennings Bryan Dorn (D)
 . Robert T. Ashmore (D)
 . Robert W. Hemphill (D), until May 1, 1964
 Thomas S. Gettys (D), from November 3, 1964
 . John L. McMillan (D)

South Dakota
 . Ben Reifel (R)
 . Ellis Yarnal Berry (R)

Tennessee
 . Jimmy Quillen (R)
 . Howard Baker Sr. (R), until January 7, 1964
 Irene Baker (R), from March 10, 1964
 . Bill Brock (R)
 . Joe L. Evins (D)
 . Richard Fulton (D)
 . Ross Bass (D), until November 3, 1964
 . Tom J. Murray (D)
 . Fats Everett (D)
 . Clifford Davis (D)

Texas
 . Joe R. Pool (D)
 . Wright Patman (D)
 . Jack Brooks (D)
 . Lindley Beckworth (D)
 . Ray Roberts (D)
 . Bruce Alger (R)
 . Olin E. Teague (D)
 . John Dowdy (D)
 . Albert Thomas (D)
 . Clark W. Thompson (D)
 . Homer Thornberry (D), until December 20, 1963
 J. J. Pickle (D), from December 21, 1963
 . William R. Poage (D)
 . Jim Wright (D)
 . Graham B. Purcell Jr. (D)
 . John Andrew Young (D)
 . Joe M. Kilgore (D)
 . Ed Foreman (R)
 . Omar Burleson (D)
 . Walter E. Rogers (D)
 . George H. Mahon (D)
 . Henry B. González (D)
 . O. C. Fisher (D)
 . Robert R. Casey (D)

Utah
 . Laurence J. Burton (R)
 . Sherman P. Lloyd (R)

Vermont
 . Robert Stafford (R)

Virginia
 . Thomas N. Downing (D)
 . Porter Hardy Jr. (D)
 . J. Vaughan Gary (D)
 . Watkins Moorman Abbitt (D)
 . William M. Tuck (D)
 . Richard Harding Poff (R)
 . John Otho Marsh Jr. (D)
 . Howard W. Smith (D)
 . W. Pat Jennings (D)
 . Joel Broyhill (R)

Washington
 . Thomas Pelly (R)
 . Jack Westland (R)
 . Julia Butler Hansen (D)
 . Catherine Dean May (R)
 . Walt Horan (R)
 . Thor C. Tollefson (R)
 . K. William Stinson (R)

West Virginia
 . Arch A. Moore Jr. (R)
 . Harley Orrin Staggers (D)
 . John M. Slack Jr. (D)
 . Ken Hechler (D)
 . Elizabeth Kee (D)

Wisconsin
 . Henry C. Schadeberg (R)
 . Robert Kastenmeier (D)
 . Vernon Wallace Thomson (R)
 . Clement J. Zablocki (D)
 . Henry S. Reuss (D)
 . William Van Pelt (R)
 . Melvin Laird (R)
 . John W. Byrnes (R)
 . Lester Johnson (D)
 . Alvin O'Konski (R)

Wyoming
 . William Henry Harrison III (R)

Non-voting members
 . Antonio Fernós-Isern (Resident Commissioner) (PPD)

Changes in membership

Senate

|-
| Oklahoma(2)
| Vacant
| Sen. Robert S. Kerr died in previous congress.Successor appointed to continue the term.
| nowrap  | J. Howard Edmondson (D)
| January 7, 1963

|-
| Wisconsin(3)
| Vacant
| Delayed taking oath of office in order to finish term as Governor of Wisconsin
| nowrap  | Gaylord Nelson (D)
| January 8, 1963

|-
| Tennessee(2)
| nowrap  | Estes Kefauver (D)
| Died August 10, 1963.Successor appointed August 20, 1963, to continue the term.
| nowrap  | Herbert S. Walters (D)
| August 20, 1963

|-
| California(1)
| nowrap  | Clair Engle (D)
| Died July 30, 1964.Successor appointed August 4, 1964.
| nowrap  | Pierre Salinger (D)
| August 4, 1964

|-
| South Carolina(2)
| nowrap  | Strom Thurmond (D)
| Changed political parties.
| nowrap  | Strom Thurmond (R)
| September 16, 1964

|-
| New Mexico(1)
| nowrap  | Edwin L. Mechem (R)
| Lost special election.Successor elected November 3, 1964.
| nowrap  | Joseph Montoya (D)
| November 4, 1964

|-
| Oklahoma(2)
| nowrap  | J. Howard Edmondson (D)
| Successor elected November 3, 1964.
| nowrap  | Fred R. Harris (D)
| November 4, 1964

|-
| Tennessee(2)
| nowrap  | Herbert S. Walters (D)
| Successor elected November 3, 1964.
| nowrap  | Ross Bass (D)
| November 4, 1964

|-
| Minnesota(2)
| nowrap  | Hubert Humphrey (DFL)
| Resigned December 29, 1964, after being elected Vice President of the United States.Successor appointed December 30, 1964, to finish the term.
| nowrap  | Walter Mondale (DFL)
| December 30, 1964

|-
| California(1)
| nowrap  | Pierre Salinger (D)
| Resigned December 31, 1964, to give successor preferential seniority.Successor appointed January 1, 1965.
| nowrap  | George Murphy (R)
| January 1, 1965

|}

House of Representatives

|-
| 
| Vacant
| style="font-size:80%" | Rep. Clement Woodnutt Miller died during previous congress
|  nowrap | Donald H. Clausen (R)
| January 22, 1963
|-
| 
|  nowrap| Clyde Doyle (D)
| style="font-size:80%" | Died March 14, 1963
|  nowrap | Del M. Clawson (R)
| June 11, 1963
|-
| 
|  nowrap| Francis E. Walter (D)
| style="font-size:80%" | Died May 31, 1963
|  nowrap | Fred B. Rooney (D)
| July 30, 1963
|-
| 
|  nowrap| Hjalmar Carl Nygaard (R)
| style="font-size:80%" | Died July 18, 1963
|  nowrap | Mark Andrews (R)
| October 22, 1963
|-
| 
|  nowrap| Leon H. Gavin (R)
| style="font-size:80%" | Died September 15, 1963
|  nowrap | Albert W. Johnson (R)
| November 3, 1963
|-
| 
|  nowrap| Homer Thornberry (D)
| style="font-size:80%" | Resigned December 20, 1963, after being appointed as a judge of the United States District Court for the Western District of Texas
|  nowrap | J. J. Pickle (D)
| December 21, 1963
|-
| 
|  nowrap| William J. Green Jr. (D)
| style="font-size:80%" | Died December 21, 1963
|  nowrap | William J. Green III (D)
| April 28, 1964
|-
| 
|  nowrap| John F. Shelley (D)
| style="font-size:80%" | Resigned January 7, 1964, after being elected Mayor of San Francisco
|  nowrap | Phillip Burton (D)
| February 18, 1964
|-
| 
|  nowrap| Howard Baker Sr. (R)
| style="font-size:80%" | Died January 7, 1964
|  nowrap | Irene Baker (R)
| March 10, 1964
|-
| 
|  nowrap| Thomas J. O'Brien (D)
| style="font-size:80%" | Died April 14, 1964
| Vacant
| Not filled this term
|-
| 
|  nowrap| Robert W. Hemphill (D)
|style="font-size:80%" | Resigned May 1, 1964, after being appointed judge of the US District Court for the Eastern and Western Districts of SC
|  nowrap | Thomas S. Gettys (D)
| November 3, 1964
|-
| 
|  nowrap| Clarence Cannon (D)
| style="font-size:80%" | Died May 12, 1964
|  nowrap | William L. Hungate (D)
| November 3, 1964
|-
| 
|  nowrap| John B. Bennett (R)
| style="font-size:80%" | Died August 9, 1964
| Vacant
| Not filled this term
|-
| 
|  nowrap| A. Walter Norblad (R)
| style="font-size:80%" | Died September 20, 1964
|  nowrap | Wendell Wyatt (R)
| November 3, 1964
|-
| 
|  nowrap| Joseph Montoya (D)
| style="font-size:80%" | Resigned November 3, 1964, after being elected to the US Senate
| rowspan=3 |Vacant
| rowspan=3 |Not filled this term
|-
| 
|  nowrap| Ross Bass (D)
| style="font-size:80%" | Resigned November 3, 1964, after being elected to the US Senate
|-
| 
|  nowrap| Edward Rowan Finnegan (D)
| style="font-size:80%" | Resigned December 6, 1964, after being appointed judge for the Circuit Court of Cook County
|}

Committees

Senate

 Aeronautical and Space Sciences (Chairman: Clinton P. Anderson; Ranking Member: Margaret Chase Smith)
 Agriculture and Forestry (Chairman: Allen J. Ellender; Ranking Member: George D. Aiken)
 Appropriations (Chairman: Carl Hayden; Ranking Member: Leverett Saltonstall)
 Armed Services (Chairman: Richard B. Russell; Ranking Member: Leverett Saltonstall)
 Banking and Currency (Chairman: A. Willis Robertson; Ranking Member: Wallace F. Bennett)
 Commerce (Chairman: Warren G. Magnuson; Ranking Member: Norris Cotton)
 District of Columbia (Chairman: Alan Bible; Ranking Member: J. Glenn Beall)
 Finance (Chairman: Harry F. Byrd; Ranking Member: John J. Williams)
 Foreign Relations (Chairman: J. William Fulbright; Ranking Member: Bourke B. Hickenlooper)
 Government Operations (Chairman: John Little McClellan; Ranking Member: Karl E. Mundt)
 Interior and Insular Affairs (Chairman: Henry M. Jackson; Ranking Member: Thomas H. Kuchel)
 Judiciary (Chairman: James O. Eastland; Ranking Member: Everett Dirksen)
 Labor and Public Welfare (Chairman: J. Lister Hill; Ranking Member: Barry Goldwater)
 Post Office and Civil Service (Chairman: Olin D. Johnston; Ranking Member: Frank Carlson)
 Public Works (Chairman: Pat McNamara; Ranking Member: John Sherman Cooper)
 Rules and Administration (Chairman: B. Everett Jordan; Ranking Member: Carl T. Curtis)
 Small Business (Select) (Chairman: John J. Sparkman)
 Standards and Conduct (Select)
 Whole

House of Representatives

 Agriculture (Chairman: Harold D. Cooley; Ranking Member: Charles B. Hoeven)
 Appropriations (Chairman: Clarence Cannon; Ranking Member: Ben F. Jensen)
 Armed Services (Chairman: Carl Vinson; Ranking Member: Leslie C. Arends)
 Banking and Currency (Chairman: Wright Patman; Ranking Member: Clarence E. Kilburn)
 District of Columbia (Chairman: John L. McMillan; Ranking Member: Joel T. Broyhill)
 Education and Labor (Chairman: Adam Clayton Powell; Ranking Member: Peter Frelinghuysen)
 Foreign Affairs (Chairman: Thomas E. Morgan; Ranking Member: Frances P. Bolton)
 Government Research (Select) (Chair: Carl Elliott)
 Government Operations (Chairman: William L. Dawson; Ranking Member: R. Walter Riehlman)
 House Administration (Chairman: Omar Burleson; Ranking Member: Paul F. Schenck)
 Interior and Insular Affairs (Chairman: Wayne N. Aspinall; Ranking Member: John P. Saylor)
 Interstate and Foreign Commerce (Chairman: Oren Harris; Ranking Member: John B. Bennett)
 Judiciary (Chairman: Emanuel Celler; Ranking Member: William M. McCulloch)
 Merchant Marine and Fisheries (Chairman: Herbert C. Bonner; Ranking Member: Thor C. Tollefson)
 Post Office and Civil Service (Chairman: Tom J. Murray; Ranking Member: Robert J. Corbett)
 Public Works (Chairman: Charles A. Buckley; Ranking Member: James C. Auchincloss)
 Rules (Chairman: Howard W. Smith; Ranking Member: Clarence J. Brown)
 Science and Astronautics (Chairman: George Paul Miller; Ranking Member: Joseph W. Martin Jr.)
 Small Business (Select) (Chairman: Joe L. Evins)
 Standards of Official Conduct
 Un-American Activities (Chairman: Francis E. Walter; Ranking Member: August E. Johansen)
 Veterans' Affairs (Chairman: Olin E. Teague; Ranking Member: William H. Ayres)
 Ways and Means (Chairman: Wilbur D. Mills; Ranking Member: John W. Byrnes)
 Whole

Joint committees

 Atomic Energy (Chairman: Sen. John O. Pastore; Vice Chairman: Rep. Chester E. Holifield)
 Conditions of Indian Tribes (Special)
 Construction of a Building for a Museum of History and Technology for the Smithsonian 
 Defense Production (Chairman: Rep. Wright Patman; Vice Chairman: Sen. A. Willis Robertson)
 Disposition of Executive Papers
 Economic (Chairman: Sen. Paul H. Douglas; Vice Chairman: Rep. Richard Walker Bolling)
 Immigration and Nationality Policy (Chairman: Vacant; Vice Chairman: Vacant)
 Legislative Budget
 The Library (Chairman: Rep. Omar Burleson; Vice Chairman: Sen. B. Everett Jordan)
 Navajo-Hopi Indian Administration
 Printing (Chairman: Sen. Carl Hayden; Vice Chairman: Rep. Omar Burleson)
 Reduction of Nonessential Federal Expenditures (Chairman: Sen. Harry F. Byrd; Vice Chairman: Rep. Clarence Cannon)
 Taxation (Chairman: Rep. Wilbur D. Mills; Vice Chairman: Sen. Harry F. Byrd)

Employees

Legislative branch agency directors
 Architect of the Capitol: J. George Stewart
 Attending Physician of the United States Congress: George Calver
 Comptroller General of the United States: Joseph Campbell 
 Librarian of Congress: Lawrence Quincy Mumford 
 Public Printer of the United States: James L. Harrison

Senate
 Chaplain: Frederick Brown Harris, Methodist
 Parliamentarian: Charles Watkins, until 1964
 Floyd Riddick, from 1964
 Secretary: Felton McLellan Johnston 
 Librarian: Richard D. Hupman
 Secretary for the Majority: Robert G. Baker, until 1963
 Francis R. Valeo, from 1963
 Secretary for the Minority: J. Mark Trice
 Sergeant at Arms: Joseph C. Duke

House of Representatives
 Clerk: Ralph R. Roberts
 Doorkeeper: William Mosley "Fishbait" Miller
 Parliamentarian: Lewis Deschler
 Postmaster: H. H. Morris
 Reading Clerks: George J. Maurer (D) and Joe Bartlett (R) 
 Sergeant at Arms: Zeake W. Johnson Jr.
 Chaplain: Bernard Braskamp - Presbyterian

See also
 1962 United States elections (elections leading to this Congress)
 1962 United States Senate elections
 1962 United States House of Representatives elections
 1964 United States elections (elections during this Congress, leading to the next Congress)
 1964 United States presidential election
 1964 United States Senate elections
 1964 United States House of Representatives elections

Notes

References

External links
 U.S. Senate history
 Party Division in the Senate, 1789-Present